Abraham Penn Jones is a Democratic member of the North Carolina House of Representatives who has represented the 38th district (including parts of Wake County) since 2021. An Attorney from Wilson, North Carolina, Jones previously served on the Wake County board of commissioners from 1990 to 1994.

Committee assignments

2021-2022 session
Appropriations 
Appropriations - Justice and Public Safety
Judiciary 1 
Regulatory Reform 
UNC BOG Nominations
Wildlife Resources

Electoral history

References

External links

Living people
Harvard University alumni
Democratic Party members of the North Carolina House of Representatives
21st-century American politicians
1952 births